Dear Frustrated Superstar is the debut album by Nerina Pallot. Following its release in August 2001, the album peaked at UK #82, but officially did not chart as the official UK Albums Chart lists only the Top 75 sellers.

Following its lack of commercial success, Pallot publicly criticised the record, which, following the success of follow-up Fires in 2006, was re-shipped to stores by Polydor at a discount price. According to UK music sales publication Music Week, the album had sold a total of 10,073 copies in the UK as of 28 May 2006.

Pallot has since begun playing material from Dear Frustrated Superstar frequently in concert.

Track listing

Singles
Two singles were released from the album, "Patience" and "Alien". "If I Know You" was planned as the third single from the album and a video was shot, however the single and video never surfaced. Following this, Nerina and Polydor parted company.

Chart statistics

References

2001 debut albums
Nerina Pallot albums